Tulipa kaufmanniana, the water lily tulip, is a species of tulip native to Central Asia.

Description 

It has lance shaped leaves which may be plain green, or blue-green. They also often have purple markings on their leaves.

It is one of the earliest tulips to bloom, between February to April.

The funnel-shaped flower, has six pointy petals that open out like a star similar to water lilies do, hence the common name. They open very wide on sunny days.
They usually have outermost petals with a different colour than interior petals. The long upright petals often have a flushed orange-red, red or purple flush on the back of the petal. Inside the petal, there maybe a butter-yellow, or yellow blotch and sometimes with further red markings. There are also red, orange, pink and clear yellow forms too.

After it has flowered it will form seeds.

Taxonomy
It is commonly known as the 'Water-lily Tulip'. because the petals of the flower open out like a star or waterlily.

The Latin specific epithet kaufmanniana refers to Konstantin von Kaufman (1818-1882) who was the first Governor-General of Russian Turkestan where the tulip was found.

It was first found in Turkestan, and then published and described by Eduard August von Regel in his botanical magazine 'Gartenflora' Vol.26 on page 194 in 1877. It was also published by Regel in Act. Hort. Petrop. Vol.5. on page 265 in 1877.

Distribution and habitat
Tulipa kaufmanniana is native to temperate areas of Central Asia. It has naturalised between southern Europe, North Africa, and Asia from Anatolia and Iran in the west to northeast of China.

Range

It is found in Kyrgyzstan, Tajikistan and in Kazakhstan.

As well as found on the mountains of Tien-Shan, the Pamir and Hindu Kush mountains.

Habitat
T. kaufmanniana grows in the wild on stony hillsides, and steppes.

Cultivation
They are suitable to be grown in the rock garden, bed and borders.
It is suitable for growing in USDA Growing Zones: 3 to 8, in full sun and soils with medium moisture retention or well-drained soils.

Seed germination of the tulip has been studied, and it was concluded that stratification for 7 weeks was more effective treatment on studied traits than 5 weeks. Moreover, cold stratification was a better treatment on breaking seed dormancy of the seeds.

Cultivars

They and their hybrids are placed in Group 12, the Kaufmanniana Group, by the Royal Horticultural Society. Their leaves often have dashes and streaks of purple, which show the influence of Tulipa greigii in the breeding programmes.

It was given the First Class Certification by the Royal Horticultural Society in 1897.

The cultivars 'Ancilla', 'Early Harvest', 'Showwinner' (deep red) and 'Stresa' have gained the Royal Horticultural Society's Award of Garden Merit. Two other Group 12 cultivars are listed by the RHS as gaining the Award of Garden Merit, 'Alfred Cortot' and 'Glück'.

Other known hybrids include 'Heart's Delight', a soft pink with an orange-yellow eye, the clear yellow 'Chopin' and white 'Concerto'.
In America, common cultivars include; 'Ancilla' soft pink, red and white flowers, 'Johann Strauss' rosy red and sulfur yellow blooms and 'Stresa' golden yellow with carmine red flowers.

Culture

In the 1960s, a postage stamp in CCCP (Russia), was issued with an image of the tulip.
Then in 1993, a postage stamp in Uzbekistan, within the Flowers series was issued with an image of the tulip.

References

Other sources
 Aldén, B., S. Ryman, & M. Hjertson. 2012. Svensk Kulturväxtdatabas, SKUD (Swedish Cultivated and Utility Plants Database; online resource) URL: www.skud.info
 Christenhusz, J. M.. et al. 2013. Tiptoe through the tulips - cultural history, molecular phylogenetics and classification of Tulipa (Liliaceae). Bot. J. Linn. Soc. 172:280-328.
 Encke, F. et al. 1993. Zander: Handwörterbuch der Pflanzennamen, 14. Auflage
 Groth, D. 2005. pers. comm. Note: re. Brazilian common names
 Huxley, A., ed. 1992. The new Royal Horticultural Society dictionary of gardening
 Komarov, V. L. et al., eds. 1934–1964. Flora SSSR.
 Liberty Hyde Bailey Hortorium. 1976. Hortus third.
 Marasek-Ciolakowska, A. et al. 2012. Breeding and cytogenetics in the genus Tulipa. Floriculture, Ornamental and plant biotechnology: Advances and topical issues. Volumes I-V. Global Science Books., London. 6(Special issue):90-97.
 Mathew, B. F. 1996. pers. comm. Note: re. common names
 Raamsdonk, L. W. D. van & T. de Vries. 1995. Species relationships and taxonomy in Tulipa subg. Tulipa (Liliaceae). Pl. Syst. Evol. 195:41.
 Walters, S. M. et al., eds. 1986–2000. European garden flora.

kaufmanniana
Plants described in 1877
Flora of Tajikistan
Flora of Kyrgyzstan
Flora of Kazakhstan